Best Laid Plans is the debut album by guitarist David Torn recorded in 1984 and released on the ECM label.

Reception
The Allmusic review by Glenn Astarita awarded the album four stars, stating "Torn possessed a sound and style on guitar that set him apart from many of his peers... Recommended".

Track listing
All compositions by David Torn except as indicated
 "Before the Bitter Wind" (David Torn, Geoffrey Gordon) - 7:20   
 "Best Laid Plans" - 7:07   
 "The Hum of Its Parts" - 3:40   
 "Removable Tongue" - 1:53   
 "In the Fifth Direction" - 6:20   
 "Two-Face Flash" (Torn, Gordon) - 6:40   
 "Angle of Incidents" - 8:40

Personnel
David Torn - guitar
Geoffrey Gordon - percussion

References

ECM Records albums
David Torn albums
Albums produced by Manfred Eicher
1984 debut albums